Dorycordaites is a genus of extinct gymnosperms.

Distribution
Fossils of this genus have been found in Permian of Egypt, France, Morocco, Niger, Spain and in Desmoinesian of United States.

References

 Paleobiology Database
 GBIF
 ING Database - Smithsonian Institution
 Enciclopedia-Italiana

Conifer genera
Pennsylvanian plants
Permian plants
Permian life of Africa
Permian life of Europe
Fossils of Egypt
Fossils of France
Fossils of Morocco
Fossils of Niger
Fossils of Spain
Fossils of the United States
Carboniferous United States
Fossil taxa described in 1888
Cordaitales
Prehistoric gymnosperm genera